Manchester Fort is a retail park in the Cheetham Hill area of Manchester, United Kingdom. The property includes 36 units with a total floorspace of 325,000 sq ft. It opened in 2005 and its anchors included B&Q and TK Maxx.

Henderson Global Investors purchased Manchester Fort in 2011 from the Universities Superannuation Scheme pension fund.

References

External links
 Manchester Fort

Shopping centres in Manchester
Retail parks in the United Kingdom